Avi Sharon is a professor of Classics, translator and consultant.

Life
He graduated from Emory University, and Boston University, with a Ph.D. in Classics, where he studied under Donald Carne-Ross and William Arrowsmith.

His work has appeared in Arion, Partisan Review, Waves, Journal of Modern Greek Studies, Kenyon Review, Yale Review, and International Quarterly.

He works on Wall Street, and lives in Brooklyn, with his wife and two sons.

Awards
 1996 Alexander S. Onassis Fellowship for scholars of Greek
 2009 Harold Morton Landon Translation Award
 2012 The Hellenic Foundation for Culture Translation Prize (Greek)

Works

Translations

Anthologies

Criticism

Reviews
Sharon has achieved an excellent balance, and certainly more so than other editors. More advanced and extensive bibliographies, introductions and/or notes, however, are to be found in the Oxford World's Classics edition of Waterfield, in the SUNY edition of Cobb, and in the Hackett edition. The translation also compares well to its competitors....

References

Year of birth missing (living people)
Living people
American male poets
Emory University alumni
Boston University alumni
Greek–English translators